Amir Dayan (אמיר דיין, born 1974 in Tel Aviv, Israel) is an Israeli businessman and investor specializing in commercial real estate. He has been active in the European real estate and hotels business since 2005, primarily in Germany, UK and Netherlands. Dayan is a shareholder in several real estate private and public stocks and funds.

Family background

Amir Dayan (אמיר דיין) has eight brothers and three sisters. The Dayan family (עסקים של אמיר דיין) owns hotels and hotel franchise rights under the name Africa Israel Hotels.

Business structure and companies

Dayan (אמיר דיין) is the principal shareholder of Ouram Holding S.à.r.l., which owns the largest shares of TLG Immobilien AG, the SDAX-listed real estate company with a focus on office, properties. On 18 November 2019 Aroundtown SA announced a merger with TLG Immobilien AG.

The value of Aroundtown is traded on the stock exchange at almost 11 billion euros, TLG has a market capitalization of over three billion euros. In February 2020 the merger has been finalized and created a company traded on the Frankfurt Stock Exchange with 14 billion euro market cap.

With the merger, the company ranks among the top 3 listed real estate companies in Europe – after Unibail-Rodamco-Westfield and Vonovia.

Companies and corporate structure

Amir Dayan and the Dayan Family are owners of the companies Ouram S.à.r.l., TLG Immobilien AG, Vivion S.a.r.l. and Golden Capital.

Ouram S.à.r.l. is a holding company with a 29% stake in TLG.

TLG Immobilien is an SDAX listed real estate company with a market capitalization of 3.2 billion Euro and a BBB rating by S&P. TLG was merged with Aroundtown SA in February 2020.

Vivion Holding S.à.r.l. is a real estate company based in Luxembourg. Its portfolio includes U.K. hotels and office buildings in Germany. The market value of assets under ownership amounts to over EUR 3 billion. Vivion owns over 50 hotels in Europe, mainly branded as Hilton, Holiday-Inn and Crowne Plaza. Vivion is rated BB+ by S&P, and issued in 2019 1 billion euro of bonds in the European capital market. The investment banks JP Morgan, Goldman Sachs and Citibank led the issuances.

Golden Capital

Vivion is also the controlling stake holder of Golden Capital, which owns mainly office buildings in Germany and the Netherlands of over 2 billion euro. The key partners of Vivion in Golden Capital are the Canadian pension fund Ivanhoe Cambridge and the Israeli funds: Harel Insurance, Phoenix Insurance, Psagot Investment House and Bank Hapoalim (the largest Israeli bank).

References

1974 births
Living people
Israeli businesspeople